Little Rock Lake is a reservoir in Benton County, Minnesota, United States. The lake was formed in 1911 by the impounding of the Mississippi River by the Sartell Dam 5 miles (8 km) downriver. Little Rock Lake was named from Little Rock Creek.

The lake has two public boat access points. Water clarity in the lake is low (less than 1.5 feet) and there are almost no aquatic plants.

References

External links
Like Rock Lake Information Minnesota Department of Natural Resources
Little Rock Lake Association

Lakes of Benton County, Minnesota
Reservoirs in Minnesota